The Brothers Čapek were Josef and Karel Čapek, Czech writers who sometimes wrote together. They are commemorated both for their literary/artistic works and political activism against oppressive government. Their house is now a cultural monument of the Czech Republic, and there are various memorials to them. Their most famous joint work is the play Pictures from the Insects' Life, a humorous political allegory.

Books
Vibrant Depths (Zářivé hlubiny) 1916 – Collection of short stories, also illustrated by Josef. The title story refers to a supposedly unsinkable ship, the Oceanik.
Giant Garden (Krakonošova zahrada) 1918 – Mixture of stories and essays, the title referring to countryside where they grew up.
Nine Fairy Tales and another by Josef Čapek as an afterthought (Devatero pohádek) 1932 – Lessons from life for children.

Plays
The Highwayman (Loupežník) 1920
Pictures from the Insects' Life (Ze života hmyzu) 1921
Adam the Creator (Adam stvořitel) 1927

Further reading

 Helena Čapková (1962) Moji milí bratři (my dear brothers) Praha: Československý spisovatel
 Ivan Margolius 'The Robot of Prague',  Newsletter, The Friends of Czech Heritage  no. 17, Autumn 2017, pp. 3 – 6.  https://czechfriends.net/images/RobotsMargoliusJul2017.pdf
 Marie Šulcová. Čapci, Ladění pro dvě struny, Poločas nadějí, Brána věčnosti, Praha: Melantrich 1993-98
 Marie Šulcová. Prodloužený čas Josefa Čapka, Praha: Paseka 2000

20th-century Czech dramatists and playwrights
Anti-fascists
Charles University alumni
Czech anti-communists
Czech science fiction writers
Czech male dramatists and playwrights
Sibling duos